Wallisch is a surname. Notable people with the surname include:

Erna Wallisch (1922–2008), guard in two Nazi concentration camps
Jan Wallisch (born 1948), Czech rower
Koloman Wallisch (1889–1934), socialist labor leader in Austria
Tom Wallisch (born 1987), American professional freeskier